Orchis quadripunctata, the four-spotted orchis, is a species of orchid found from southern Italy to the eastern Mediterranean.

quadripunctata